El Corte Airport,  is an airport  south-southeast of Talagante, a city in the Santiago Metropolitan Region of Chile.

See also

Transport in Chile
List of airports in Chile

References

External links
OpenStreetMap - El Corte
OurAirports - El Corte
FallingRain - El Corte Airport

Airports in Santiago Metropolitan Region